Boro'line Maidstone, previously Maidstone Borough Council Transport was a municipal bus operator in Maidstone and the surrounding villages. Maidstone Borough Council Transport was formed in 1974 from Maidstone Corporation Transport following local government reorganisation. In 1986 Boro'line Maidstone was formed as an arm's length company of Maidstone council from the operations of Maidstone Borough Council Transport. The company had a brief London operation. Following financial difficulties, the London operation was sold to Kentish Bus, and after a period of administration, the assets of the Maidstone operation (the vehicles and the Armstrong Road depot and offices) was sold to Maidstone & District in 1992.

History

Maidstone Borough Council Transport
In 1974, Maidstone Corporation became Maidstone Borough Council Transport, following reorganisation of local government which extended the council's reach into Maidstone. This coincided with the retirement of the general manager of the organisation, leading to a policy shift to replace the fully double deck fleet inherited from Maidstone Corporation with lightweight single deckers.

In 1976 the network was revised following the opening of the Stoneborough Centre Bus Station. In 1977, conversion to one man operation was completed as double deck bus operation ceased. In 1978 route numbers were introduced to the expanding network, co-ordinated with Maidstone & District (M&D).

Maidstone Area Bus Services
On 9 August 1981, Maidstone Borough Council services were integrated with that of M&D under the banner "Maidstone Area Bus Services", with a yellow on black hop barn motif. This was as a result of one of the National Bus Company's Market Analysis Projects (MAP). The MAP analysis resulted in the major alteration of services, seeing some swapping and diversion of routes and the extension of Maidstone Borough routes outside the borough to southern villages. This also saw closure of M&D's Maidstone depot in Knightrider Street.

Deregulation and London expansion
On 26 October 1986, to fulfill a requirement of the Transport Act 1985, Maidstone Borough Council's bus services divested into arm's length, but council-owned, company Maidstone Borough Transport (Holdings) Limited and other subsidiaries trading under the Best Impressions-inspired Boro'line Maidstone branding with a new yellow/blue livery. 

Boro'line was launched on 27 October 1986 with a guest appearance from Inspector Blakey from On the Buses.

The co-ordinated Maidstone Area Bus Services arrangement was terminated, as the same Transport Act 1985 outlawed such arrangements, with bus operators being forced to compete with each other in the new deregulated environment. Thus National Bus Company's East Kent and Maidstone & District subsidiaries and Boro'line, along with local private operators such as Nu-Venture and Farleigh Coaches who started local bus operations, ended up as competitors.

Maidstone & District was sold in a management buyout on 7 November 1986.

Meanwhile, seeking expansion, Boro'line saw that opportunities lay mainly outside the traditional operating area. Thus, as well as moving on a large scale into coach operation, Boro'line was from 16 January 1988 an early participant in the new London Regional Transport route tendering post-deregulation system (see article Boro'line London).

Demise
In 1989, Boro'line posted a loss of £1.25 million, and by October 1991 the council decided to try to sell the company. M&D were not short listed as a potential buyer despite their interest.

Facing possible competition from the new buyer, in 1991 M&D relocated its Maidstone outstation from the Boro'line's Armstrong Road garage to a site near Maidstone West railway station, and registered new routes on several of Boro'line's routes. In response Boro'line started routes to Chatham and Cranbrook, and local Medway routes. This was not successful due to unpopularity of Boro'lines single deck buses, and M&D's ownership of the Pentagon bus station in Chatham.

On 17 February 1992, the London operation was sold to Kentish Bus. Two days later, Boro'line was placed into administration. On 29 May 1992, after set-backs with repossession of five front-line buses (including Leyland Lynxes) due to lease payments not being made, Boro'line ceased operations. 

The vehicles, fixtures and fittings, along with the Armstrong Road offices and depot was sold to M&D by the administrators. M&D disposed of the Boro'line fleet and registered the routes it didn't already cover under its competing network.

Liveries

The fiesta blue Maidstone Corporation bus livery persisted into the Maidstone Borough Council era, with buses receiving The Maidstone Borough Council fleetnames.

In 1979 to commemorate the 75th anniversary of Maidstone municipal transport, the ochre colour scheme previously used by Maidstone Corporation was painted onto a single decker, which later became the standard livery into the era of single deck Maidstone Area Bus Services operation. Notably, most M&D vehicles did not acquire the MABS logo, due to the probability of the operating from depots other than Maidstone.

Some Leyland Leopard coaches acquired from Nottingham were kept in their original 'Lilac Leopard' livery.

Boro'line was launched with a bold new livery, designed by Best Impressions, who would later go on to design the last independent Maidstone & District livery. The livery consisted of a blue lower and yellow upper base, with white Boro'line logo, red Maidstone strapline and line, with a silver skirt. From 1976 until well after the launch of Boro'line, vehicles in Maidstone could be seen in a variety of liveries, with some retaining either old Maidstone liveries, or the liveries in which they arrived in. Some ochre vehicles only received a yellow front and Boro'line logos, or blue and yellow base with piecemeal detail application. The use in service of many hired or demonstration vehicles caused many other liveries or white buses with Boro'line logos to be used in service.

Boro'line operated the newly extended and increased Maidstone Borough Council Park & Ride system, which had grown from a seasonal and Saturday operation in the mid-1980s. Thus some Bedfords, MCW Metroriders and DAF SB220s were painted into the Borough's yellow and green Park and Ride livery.

Fleet

Buses
Following the decision to convert to single deck operation, Maidstone Borough standardised on the Bedford Y series chassis, with mostly Duple bodies. With the advent of Boro'line, with the exception of London contracts, there was no vehicle standard for Boro'line, although double deckers returned to Maidstone under the company. Boro’line purchases for Maidstone were the Scania K92, DAF SB220s, Leyland Lynx, Dodge and MCW Metrorider minibuses. Three second hand Bristol LHs were acquired from East Kent's Ashford operations. Some of the second hand vehicles used for London tenders were later transferred to Maidstone, Boro'line including Leyland Nationals as well as some Volvo Ailsa B55s.

Coaches
Maidstone Borough purchased several Duple-bodied Bedford coaches, and in 1976 14 Leyland Leopard coaches were acquired from Nottingham (The Lilac Leopards - see liveries), allowing withdrawal of the final double deckers of Maidstone Corporation. As with the bus fleet, Boro’line operated a number of coach types without a standard vehicle. Some coaches were used for excursions, although many saw service in Maidstone on passenger routes, with some even fitted with bus seats.

Several Maidstone Borough coaches received names:
Maidstone Minstrel
Maidstone Monarch
Maidstone Maiden JKJ 278V
Maidstone Marksman
Maidstone Mountaineer TER 5S

Rare vehicles
 Rare vehicles operated by Maidstone Borough included all of the 4 Bedford JJL midibuses built.
 A Leyland Titan PD3 with Queen Mary bodywork new to Southdown was acquired from a Welsh operator. Re-registered from BUF 287C to 217 UKL, it was conductor-operated on the Park Wood service and also used on contract work, and latterly as a driver trainer.
 In 1989 Maidstone Mountaineer TER 5S was rebodied with a Willowbrook 'Warrior' body.
 Maidstone Marksman was a rare Wrightbus Contour coach body on a Bedford YNT chassis.

Ancillary vehicles
Maidstone Borough Council Transport maintained a Bedford towing vehicle which regularly saw action in the town as the Bedford fleet aged.

See also
Boro'line London
Maidstone Corporation Transport
Maidstone & District Motor Services

References

External links
Boroline in Bexleyheath

Borough of Maidstone
Maidstone Borough Council
1986 establishments in England
1992 disestablishments in England
Former bus operators in Kent